Hans Busk the elder (28 May 1772 – 8 February 1862) was a Welsh poet, who published poems during the period 1814–34.

His poems included titles such as "The Banquet", "The Dessert" and "The Vestriad".  Although obscure today, they did receive some attention at the time, for instance "The Banquet" and "The Vestriad" were reviewed in the Literary Gazette, the latter on the front page.

Hans Busk lived at Glenalder Hall (or Glenalders), Nantmel, Radnorshire, Wales, and was a justice of the peace. He served as High Sheriff of Radnorshire in 1837.  He later lived at Culverden Grove, Tunbridge Wells, Kent.

He lived for many years at Great Cumberland Place, near Hyde Park in the City of Westminster, where he died in 1862.

Family

He was the youngest son of Sir Wadsworth Busk and Alice, daughter of Edward Parish.  His father served as Attorney General of the Isle of Man for more than twenty years, where Hans received his early education. His grandfather Jacob Hans Busk was an immigrant from Sweden or Norway.

In April or May 1814 he married Maria, daughter of Joseph Green.  His eldest son was Hans Busk the younger.  His daughters were Julia Clara Pitt Byrne; Rachel Harriette Busk; Maria Georgiana Loder, wife of Sir Robert Loder, 1st Baronet; Amelia Sophia Crawford (1817–1896); and Frances Rosalie Vansittart (involved in the important legal case Vansittart v. Vansittart against her husband in the Court of Chancery).  The book Converts to Rome separately lists all five of his daughters as having converted to Catholicism, although in the case of Maria Georgiana it was when she was in her seventies.

References

 
 Hans Busk (1772-1862) (thePeerage.com)

External links

1772 births
1862 deaths
Anglo-Welsh poets
High Sheriffs of Radnorshire
19th-century Welsh poets